Handöls quarry is a soapstone quarry in Sweden near the Norwegian border. The composition of the soapstone has been estimated at 72% talc, 16% chlorite, 5.5% magnetite, 5% amphibole (chiefly tremolite and actinolite) and 1.5% carbonate.

References

Quarries in Sweden
Åre